Thénardite is an anhydrous sodium sulfate mineral, Na2SO4 which occurs in arid evaporite environments, specifically lakes and playas. It also occurs in dry caves and old mine workings as an efflorescence and as a crusty sublimate deposit around fumaroles. It occurs in volcanic caves on Mount Etna, Italy. It was first described in 1825 for an occurrence in the Espartinas Saltworks, Ciempozuelos, Madrid, Spain and was named for the French chemist, Louis Jacques Thénard (1777–1826).

Thénardite crystallizes in the orthorhombic system and often forms yellowish, reddish to gray white prismatic crystals although usually in massive crust deposits. Thénardite is fluorescent, white in shortwave and yellow-green in longwave UV radiation. 

In humid conditions, thenardite progressively absorbs water and converts to the deca-hydrated mineral mirabilite, Na2SO4 · 10 H2O.

Gallery

References

Bibliography
Palache, P.; Berman H.; Frondel, C. (1960). "Dana's System of Mineralogy, Volume II: Halides, Nitrates, Borates, Carbonates, Sulfates, Phosphates, Arsenates, Tungstates, Molybdates, Etc. (Seventh Edition)" John Wiley and Sons, Inc., New York, pp. 404-407.

Sodium minerals
Sulfate minerals
Orthorhombic minerals
Minerals in space group 70
Cave minerals
Evaporite
Luminescent minerals